Wang Xudong may refer to:

Wang Xudong (politician) (born 1946), Chinese politician
Wang Xudong (curator) (born 1967), curator of the Palace Museum, China